The Tasmanian Government Railways V class are a class of diesel locomotives operated by the Tasmanian Government Railways.

History
The V class were the first diesel locomotives operated by the Tasmanian Government Railways (TGR) with four delivered by the Vulcan Foundry in 1948 to a design by the Drewry Car Co. which was similar to that of the standard gauge British Rail Class 04. 
In 1951 a fellow two were delivered followed by another two in 1955. Between 1959 and 1968 the TGR built a further four at its Launceston Workshops.

Two identical locomotives were purchased by the Mount Lyell Mining and Railway Company in 1953. When it closed in 1963, 2405 was sold to  the Emu Bay Railway as number 22, while 2406 went to the TGR as V13. All the TGR units were withdrawn between 1983 and 1987 while the Emu Bay unit remained in service until 2000.

The units classified VA differ in that they were downgraded Vs with a 6 cylinder 6L3 Gardiner diesel (instead of the 8 cylinder) and a four speed epicyclic gearbox (instead of five speeds). V1 & V8 were both converted VA specifications.  V8 was later converted back to standard configuration with its engine going to V3.

Ten have been preserved:
VA1 by The Bellarine Railway, Victoria
V2 by the Don River Railway
V4 by the Hotham Valley Railway, Western Australia
V5 by the Hotham Valley Railway, Western Australia
V7 by the Derwent Valley Railway
V8 by The Bellarine Railway, Victoria
V9 by the West Coast Wilderness Railway
V12 by the Puffing Billy Railway, Victoria (rebuilt to 760 mm gauge, converted to Westinghouse air braking and numbered D21)
V13 by the Zig Zag Railway, New South Wales, sold to the West Coast Wilderness Railway, renumbered D2 and fitted with a rack drive unit. 
V22 by the West Coast Wilderness Railway, renumbered D1

References

Diesel locomotives of Tasmania
Railway locomotives introduced in 1948
Vulcan Foundry locomotives